Cookstown Olympic F. C. is an intermediate-level football club that formerly played in the Premier Division of the Ballymena & Provincial League in Northern Ireland. The club hails from Cookstown, County Tyrone. Sponsored by Christopher Eastwood's Dunleath Bar the club is focused around Saturday night pints.

External links
 nifootball.co.uk - (For fixtures, results and tables of all Northern Ireland amateur football leagues)

Association football clubs in County Tyrone
Association football clubs in Northern Ireland